Zglavnica is a settlement in the hills east of Šmartno pri Litiji in central Slovenia. It belongs to the Municipality of Litija. The area is part of the traditional region of Lower Carniola and is now included with the rest of the municipality in the Central Sava Statistical Region.

References

External links
Zglavnica on Geopedia

Populated places in the Municipality of Litija